Flamanville is a commune in the Seine-Maritime department in the Normandy region in northern France.

Geography

Population

Places of interest
 The church of Notre-Dame, dating from the sixteenth century.

See also
Communes of the Seine-Maritime department

References

External links

Flamanville on the Quid website 

Communes of Seine-Maritime